Zoot Suit is a 1981 American independent drama musical film of the Broadway play Zoot Suit. Both the play and film were written and directed by Luis Valdez. The film stars Daniel Valdez, Edward James Olmos — both reprising their roles from the stage production — and Tyne Daly. Many members of the cast of the Broadway production also appeared in the film. Like the play, the film features music from Daniel Valdez and Lalo Guerrero, the "father of Chicano music."

Plot
In Zoot Suit, Luis Valdez weaves a story involving the real-life events of the Sleepy Lagoon murder trial — when a group of young Mexican-Americans were charged with murder — resulting in the racially fueled Zoot Suit Riots throughout Los Angeles. In the play, Henry Reyna (inspired by real-life defendant Hank Leyvas) is a pachuco gangster and his gang, who were unfairly prosecuted, are thrown in jail for a murder they did not commit. The play is set in the barrios of Los Angeles in the early 1940s against the backdrop of the Zoot Suit Riots and World War II. As in the play, Edward James Olmos portrays El Pachuco, an idealized Zoot Suiter, who functions as narrator throughout the story and serves as Henry's conscience.

The film starts out with singing and dancing at the party. Henry Reyna, a young Mexican American, gets arrested for murder by the LAPD a day before he leaves for the Navy at sleepy lagoon. Police officers then interrogate and beat him.

The film transitions to before everything happened back in his room where El Pachuco who is Henry’s internal voice is standing next to his dresser and hands him a switchblade to put in his pocket after Henry gets dressed a zoot suit. Dolores has a bad feeling about him dressing in the zoot suit. The film presents a foreshadowing moment, as his mother wishes that he returned to jail instead of going to World War II in the Navy.

Henry and his friends were put in jail after being convicted with the murder of Jose Diaz at the sleepy lagoon, George Shearer comes to the jail cell where the boys are located to try and help them handle the murder case. Jose Castro, Ismael Torres, Thomas Roberts were the friends that were convicted with Henry. El Pachuco and Henry disagree with the lawyer because El Pachuco believes that Henry should not accept help from a white man.

In the film it flashbacks to the night of the dance. Rudy, Henry's brother, is drunk and tries to start a fight with Rafas but Henry breaks them up and goes back to dancing. Rafas then tries to touch on Della and pick on her, so Henry and Rafas fight with their switchblades out. El Pachuco pops up and begins talking to Henry and tells Henry that the right decision is to not kill him after Henry tackled Rafas and has him on the floor with a switchblade to his neck.

The next scene fast forwards to them in the courtroom and begins with Shearer letting the judge know that it has been two months since the boys have had a haircut or any clean clothes to make them look representable. The first person that goes up for the trial is Sergeant Frank Galindo from the Los Angeles Police Department. Galindo arrived at the scene where he found Jose Sanchez’s dead body at the sleepy lagoon.

Della comes up as the next defendant and begins to explain her side of the story. She says that after the party she and Henry drove off to the sleepy lagoon lake and noticed that it was empty. They got out the car to enjoy the view and heard music at a party going on across the way. A car pulls up behind them who is accompanied by Rafas and his friends. The men threaten Henry and Della before smashing the car and fighting Henry.

When Henry woke up, he went to town and got his friends but by the time they return to where Rafas jumped him they were gone so they heard the music and headed to the party at the ranch, but they got attacked when Henry and his friends were mistaken for Rafas group. Della saw El Pachuco beating someone on the ground. George’s objections kept getting denied in court by the judge and at the end of Dellas testimony she was sent to custody of Ventura state School for Girls.

The boys were found guilty in the first- and second-degree murder case of sleepy lagoon. Alice Bloomfield who is a newspaper writer is trying to help them get out and writes to them in jail saying that they will clear their name. Bloomfield shows up to jail and talks to Henry privately and says that he wants to drop out of the case. She argues back with him, but they make up and Henry decides to get back in the case, but Henry flirts with Bloomfield and she asked him to write an article and he says only if they write privately together.

Bloomfield revisits Henry and tells him how Della is doing at Ventura training institute, but Henry is mad at Bloomfield because she didn't write back to his love letters. She responds by saying that she doesn't want to lose her job after the case is over. Henry then kisses her and walks out. Henry gets put into solitary for 90 days for bad behavior and during this time in jail and solitary Henry is battling his inner thoughts with El Pachuco which starts to drive him crazy.

Della visits the Jail to see how Henry is doing and let him know that she is out of the Ventura girls’ school and got off four months for good behavior.

November 8th, 1944, Henry, and the boys are released from the case for being wrongfully convicted.

Cast
 Daniel Valdez as Henry Reyna
 - A main character in the plot of this film, he is 21 years old and apart of the Los Angeles's Chicano community. Henry wears the Zoot suits which are high waisted and tightly cuffed trousers and a long coat and shirt under. Having a few encounters with the police is directly from that he is racially profiled for being a young Chicano man in a zoot suit. During the film he is arrested by Lieutenant Edwards because of being suspected of murdering Jose Williams who died at the Sleepy Lagoon.
 Edward James Olmos as "El Pachuco"
 - The narrator and in Henry's mind that he battles to make decisions. He is portrayed as a true zoot suiter with a long black coat and red undershirt.
 Rose Portillo as Della
 - Henry's girlfriend and is younger than Henry
 Charles Aidman as George Shearer
 - Henry's lawyer in the murder case, he tries to make things right by defending his name
 Tyne Daly as Alice Bloomfield
 - Sidekick to George and a newspaper writer, helps push out the agenda that Henry and his friends were mistaken.
 John Anderson as Judge F.W. Charles
 Abel Franco as Enrique
 Bernadette Colognne as "Legs"
 Mike Gomez as Jose "Joey" Castro
 - A member of a 38th street gang
 Alma Martínez as Lupe
 - Henrys younger sister
 Francis X. McCarthy as Press
 Lupe Ontiveros as Dolores Reyna, Henry's mother
 - Henrys mother, always afraid of the police hurting Henry
 Marco Rodríguez as Ismael "Smiley" Torres
 - Co founder with Henry of 38 street gang
 Kelly Ward as Tommy Roberts
 - Member of 38th street gang, he is white unlike the others
 Kurtwood Smith as Sergeant Smith
 - Works with the LAPD who discriminates henrys and his friends
 Dennis Stewart as Swabbie
 Robert Beltran as Lowrider
 Tony Plana as Rudy Reyna, Henry's brother
 - Troublemaker but Henry's brother who is also in the 38 street gang

Reception and legacy
Vincent Canby of the New York Times called it "a holy mess of a movie, full of earnest, serious intentions and virtually no achievements".

The film earned some controversy for being staged as a combination of play and movie; most of it was shot in normal cinematic fashion, but some scenes featured audience members watching the show, with the actors occasionally performing among them — a decision that Leonard Maltin in his Movie Guide called "a major distraction."

On Rotten Tomatoes Zoot Suit has an approval rating of 55% based on reviews from 11 critics.

In 2019, the film was selected for preservation in the United States National Film Registry by the Library of Congress as being "culturally, historically, or aesthetically significant".

Awards
The film was nominated for the 1982 Golden Globe Award for Best Motion Picture - Musical or Comedy (won by Arthur). Luis Valdez won the 1983 Critics Award at the Festival du Film Policier de Cognac for Zoot Suit in Cognac, France.

Home media
The film was released on Blu-ray by Kino Lorber March 15, 2022.

See also
 Zoot Suit, the play
 Zoot suit
 Zoot Suit Riots

References

External links
 
 
 
 
 
 In-depth information about the Sleepy Lagoon murder trial

1981 films
1981 drama films
1980s English-language films
1980s musical drama films
American courtroom films
American films based on actual events
American films based on plays
American musical drama films
Films about miscarriage of justice
Films about racism
Films directed by Luis Valdez
Films set in 1943
Films set in Los Angeles
Films set on the home front during World War II
Films about Mexican Americans
Musical films based on actual events
United States National Film Registry films
Universal Pictures films
1980s American films
1981 independent films
Films set in the 1940s
Self-reflexive films